Hochelaga—Maisonneuve (formerly known as Maisonneuve) was a federal electoral district in Quebec, Canada, that was represented in the House of Commons of Canada from 1979 to 2004.

It was created in 1976 as "Maisonneuve" riding from parts of Hochelaga, Lafontaine and Maisonneuve—Rosemont ridings. It was renamed "Hochelaga—Maisonneuve" in 1978.

The riding was abolished in 2003 when it was redistributed into Hochelaga, Honoré-Mercier and La Pointe-de-l'Île ridings.

Members of Parliament

This riding elected the following Members of Parliament:

Election results

See also 

 List of Canadian federal electoral districts
 Past Canadian electoral districts

External links
Riding history for Maisonneuve from the Library of Parliament
Riding history for Hochelaga—Maisonneuve from the Library of Parliament

Former federal electoral districts of Quebec